Aspy may refer to:

 Aspy River, northeastern Cape Breton Island, Nova Scotia, Canada
 Aspy Fault, in the same region as the river
 Aspy Bay

People
 Aspy Engineer (1912–2002), Indian diplomat
 Aspy Adajania, Indian sports administrator
Aspy, Romanian musician

See also
 ASPI (disambiguation)
 Aspies, a person with Asperger syndrome